Alessandro Salvio (c. 1575 – c. 1640) was a leading Italian chess player in the early 17th century. He started a chess academy in Naples, and wrote a book called Trattato dell'Inventione et Arte Liberale del Gioco Degli Scacchi, which was published in Naples in 1604. He also wrote Il Puttino published in 1634. According to JH Saratt's translation, Il Puttino was first published in 1604, and republished in 1634.

Salvio Gambit
The Salvio Gambit is a gambit in the King's Gambit Accepted. It is as follows; 1.e4 e5 2.f4 exf4 3.Nf3 g5 4.Bc4 g4 5.Ne5 Qh4+ 6.Kf1.

See also
 Lucena position

References

Bibliography

Further reading
The works of Damiano, Ruy-Lopez, and Salvio on the game of chessVon J. H. Sarratt, Damiano, Ruy López de Sigura, Alessandro Salvio, Printed for T. Boosey, 1813 Original von Oxford University
The Chess player's chronicle, The light and lustre of chess, by George Walker, 1843

Italian chess players
1570s births
1640s deaths
17th-century chess players
Chess theoreticians